The Kia K5, formerly known as the Kia Optima, is a mid-size car manufactured by Kia since 2000 and marketed globally through various nameplates. First generation cars were mostly marketed as the Optima, although the Kia Magentis name was used in Europe and Canada when sales began there in 2002. For the second-generation models, Kia used the Kia Lotze and Kia K5 name for the South Korean market, and the Magentis name globally, except in the United States, Canada and Malaysia, where the Optima name was retained until the 2021 model year. The K5 name is used for all markets since the introduction of the fifth generation in 2019.

First generation (MS; 2000)

From 2000–2005, Optimas were a rebadged variant of the Hyundai Sonata, differing from the Sonata only in minor exterior styling details and equipment content. It was first shown in South Korea in July 2000 and was the first product of the Kia-Hyundai platform integration plan.

In Australia, the Optima was introduced in May 2001, offered only with a 2.5 L V6 engine, and choice of manual or automatic transmission. The updated Optima was offered with a new 2.7 L engine, 4-speed automatic (the manual was dropped), and features such as full leather interior and alloy wheels were made standard. Thanks in part to better marketing, sales increased to 41,289 units in 2005, an all-time high. The Optima was sold until 2006, when it was replaced by the Magentis.

Safety
The 2001 Optima received Poor to Average ratings from the Insurance Institute for Highway Safety (IIHS).

Update
The 2002 Optima received a minor update. A luxurious version of the Optima was sold in South Korea as the "Optima Regal", using the 2-liter four or the 2.5-liter V6 only. The grille was redesigned for the United States in 2003 (2004 model year) to feature the Kia badge, and the headlamps were restyled for 2004 (2005 model year).

Engines

Second generation (MG; 2005)

The second generation Optima, known as the Kia Magentis globally except in United States and Malaysia, and as the Kia Lotze in South Korea, was launched in South Korea in November 2005. This generation differed further from the Hyundai Sonata donor vehicle than the previous model. Unlike the previous Optima though, this vehicle uses a global platform, unique to Kia, designated "MG". The car continues to be built in South Korea and shares its 2.4-liter inline-four engine, five-speed Sportmatic automatic or five-speed manual transmission with the Sonata.

The second generation Optima was launched in Malaysia on 15 August 2007 powered by a 2.0-liter Theta DOHC CVVT engine with a 4-speed automatic transmission.

Safety
The Optima received a crash test rating of five stars from the NHTSA, and four stars from Euro NCAP. The 2006 Optima received Marginal to Good ratings from the Insurance Institute for Highway Safety (IIHS).

Update

The Optima was revised and updated in 2008, debuting at the New York International Auto Show (as a 2009 model year). This update features new front-end styling and tail lamps. There is also a new engine and the interior has also been revised. Main changes in the interior are a redesigned instrument cluster and a Sirius Satellite Radio/AM/FM/MP3/CD with an auxiliary jack. In certain markets, the option of satellite navigation is offered.

There is a 2.0L I4 for other markets with either a 5-speed manual or 4-speed automatic transmission. Top speed rated up to  outside of the US. A five-speed manual transmission is standard in the base model, and a five-speed automatic is included with mid- and high-end levels (or as an option in the base model).

2010 models see the addition of a Proximity Key with Push-Button Start and paddle shifters on SX models.

In Australia, the Magentis was introduced in August 2006, and replaced the Optima. Initially available with a choice of 2.4 L 4-cylinder or 2.7 L V6 engines, the Magentis' sales never caught on, with sales peaking at only 741 units in 2007. In 2008, the V6 engine was dropped, as was the EX-L model, leaving only the entry-level 2.4 L EX on sale until its discontinuation in 2009. While the facelifted 2010 model was never officially launched, a very small number were imported for "evaluation" purposes, and eventually sold to the public as demos.

U.S. engines

Third generation (TF; 2010)

The completely redesigned Optima, sharing the same platform as its sibling Hyundai i40, named the Kia K5 in the South Korean and Chinese markets, made its world debut at the 2010 New York International Auto Show. It features a much sleeker, sportier profile designed by new Kia design chief Peter Schreyer, following the new design language featured on the Kia Forte, Kia Sorento, and upcoming Kia Sportage and Kia Cadenza — and using Kia's new corporate grille, known as the Tiger Nose, also designed by Schreyer. Lead designer of the TF in the team of Peter Schreyer and Miklos Kovacs was the Italian Davide Limongelli. For the first time, this model will be using the Optima name worldwide, where the Magentis name had been used previously.

As with its Hyundai Sonata sibling, the Optima's lineup has been replaced with a universal GDI 2.4-liter 4-cylinder engine, either mated to a 6-speed automatic transmission with Eco dash display, or to a 6-speed manual transmission that is standard on only the LX model. Sales began in fall 2010. The new K5 was released in the South Korean market on 29 April 2010.

The new Optima retains its trim lines of the base LX, upscale EX, and sporty SX models. Standard equipment includes safety features such as electronic stability control (ESC) and ABS brakes, as well as Sirius Satellite Radio, cooled glove box, iPod connectivity, and handsfree Bluetooth phone operation. Starting in October 2013, on LX models, Kia will offer the UVO infotainment system by Microsoft as part of the convenience package.  EX model options include Kia's new UVO infotainment system by Microsoft, integrated backup camera, and Proximity Key with Push-Button Start. A panoramic moonroof, heated and cooled front seats, heated rear seats and a navigation system are also available. SX models add a rear spoiler, metal pedals, black hybrid metal and carbon insert trim, paddle shifters, and illuminated scuff plates. The third generation Optima came with two different ignition options. On some, the ignition is fitted to the steering column with a turn key. In certain specifications, the keyhole is inside of the glove box, with a start button located on the dashboard.

A Hybrid model and a Turbo model were also released. In addition, a wagon version was planned for European markets, and two-door coupé version was mooted for the United States. The turbo model will have the same powertrain as the Hyundai Sonata 2.0T. The car is estimated to obtain  on the highway.

The third generation Kia Optima is built and manufactured in West Point, Georgia, which began in 2011 with the 2012 model.

In Australia, the new Optima went on sale in January 2011. Initially available in only one grade, the highly specified "Platinum", it was later joined by an entry-level "Si" model in the 2012 model year. Both models feature a 2.4L GDI engine with 6-speed automatic. A manual was not offered.

The facelifted 2014 model was unveiled at the 2013 New York International Auto Show in March.

The third generation Kia Optima was launched in Malaysia on 27 December 2011 powered by a 2.0 liter Theta II MPI engine with a 6-speed automatic transmission and in January 2014 the facelift version was launched in Malaysia.

Safety
The 2011 Optima received a "Top Safety Pick" rating from the Insurance Institute for Highway Safety (IIHS).

Reception
In a March 2012 comparison test by Car and Driver, the Optima came in third place out of six cars behind the first place Volkswagen Passat and the second place Honda Accord.

Powertrain

Hybrid version

The 2011 Kia Optima Hybrid was unveiled at the 2010 Los Angeles Auto Show, and was launched in the U.S. market in November 2011. During its first month in the market sold 524 units.  Considering cumulative sales in the U.S. market through December 2011, with 19,672 units sold, together the Hyundai Sonata Hybrid and the Kia Optima Hybrid ranked second in hybrid sales for calendar year 2011, after the Toyota Prius.

The Optima Hybrid uses the Hyundai Sonata Hybrid powertrain, combining a 2.4-liter MPI engine with a six-speed automatic transmission, and a 30kW electric motor and lightweight lithium polymer batteries to produce a full gasoline-electric hybrid with an estimated fuel consumption of  city and  highway. Korean and European markets will get the Optima Hybrid with a 2.0-liter turbocharged engine.

It also utilizes an active shutter system behind the upper grille, allowing the car to redirect airflow when the gas engine's heat levels allow (such as when the car is operating in EV mode to improve aerodynamics, or to assist in more rapid warming up of the gas engine).

In September 2011, the Optima Hybrid set a Guinness World Record for "Lowest Fuel Consumption in a Hybrid Gasoline Vehicle" while driving across the continental United States for 14 days, starting from the Kia factory in West Point, Georgia. In its 7,899-mile drive across the 48 states, the car recorded an average of 64.55 miles per gallon while consuming a total of five and a half tanks of gasoline. In order to qualify for the record, the car had two people and luggage throughout the entire trip.

Fourth generation (JF; 2015)

The 2016 Kia Optima went on-sale towards the end of 2015. It shares a platform with the 2015 Hyundai Sonata, and offers a new design, with new features and enhancements. As with the previous-generation Optima, the new model was designed by Kia's Chief of Design, Peter Schreyer. Unveiled at the 10th Seoul Motor Show in April 2015, the new K5 was released in the South Korean market on 15 July 2015.

For the Malaysian market, the fourth generation Kia Optima was launched in May 2017 powered by the Theta II 2.0 liter turbocharged four-cylinder gasoline engine with a 6-speed automatic transmission.

Sportswagon 
At the 2016 Geneva Motor Show, Kia revealed the Sportswagon variant of the Optima. Developed mainly for the European market by Kia's European design team, Kia says the model represents a significant growth opportunity in Europe, as two thirds of all models sold in the class are estates, rising to three quarters when looking purely at fleet sales. In its case, Kia says the estate could outsell the sedan version six to one.

Powertrain

Plug-in hybrid

A plug-in hybrid variant was unveiled at the 2016 Chicago Auto Show. The plug-in hybrid features a 50 kW electric motor and 2.0-liter “Nu” four-cylinder GDI engine, mated to a six-speed automatic transmission.

Retail deliveries began in the United States in January 2017 with 40 units sold.

Facelift (2018)

The facelifted Kia Optima was officially revealed at the 2018 Geneva Motor Show. In January, the facelifted Kia K5 was introduced in South Korean market.

Safety
The 2017 Optima received a "Top Safety Pick+" rating from the Insurance Institute for Highway Safety (IIHS).

Awards
The Optima is a two-time winner of the International Car of the Year award. it also won the 2016 Red Dot "Best of the Best" Award.

Kia Optima Convertible Concept
The Kia Optima Convertible Concept was shown in 2015; a 4-door concept car similar to the Kia Optima sedan without a roof and rear-hinged doors for the rear passengers in place of the front-hinged doors of the production car.

Fifth generation (DL3; 2019)

The fifth generation Optima is badged as the K5 worldwide. It was first unveiled in November 2019 and released in South Korea on 12 December 2019. Its overall design is similar to that of the Sonata, with a fastback-like profile, a trend that began in the 1940s. However, the styling is unique, featuring Z-shaped running lights, a textured grille and a chrome strip that runs along the window line and becomes more prominent at the C-pillar. The interior has been redesigned significantly as well, with an optional 12.3-inch digital cluster and 10.3-inch center screen, augmented by Apple CarPlay and Android Auto and an optional 12-speaker Bose audio system.

Under the hood, engines mostly mirror that of the Sonata, with the base 4-cylinder turbo 1.6-liter engine producing 180 hp and 195 lb⋅ft of torque  and the GT receiving a high-performance 2.5-liter turbocharged four-cylinder unit with 286 hp and 311 lb⋅ft of torque. All-wheel drive is newly available on some trim levels, distinguishing it from the Sonata.

Depending on the market, Advanced Driver Assistance Systems (ADAS) include Forward Collision-avoidance Assist (FCA), Blind-spot View Monitor (BVM) with Surround View Monitor (SVM) and Blind-spot Collision-avoid Assist (BCA), Smart Cruise Control (SCC) or Navigation-based SCC (NSCC), Lane Following Assist (LFA), Driver Attention Warning (DAW), and Highway Driving Assist (HDA).

Kia was confirmed that the car is not to be available for the European markets or any right-hand-drive markets (such as Asia, Australasia and Africa) due to the shrinking traditional sedan market.

Markets

North America 
In June 2020, Kia unveiled the US-market K5, renaming it from the Optima. Both the 1.6-liter turbocharged and 2.5-liter naturally aspirated Smartstream inline four-cylinder gasoline engines will be available with either front wheel drive or all wheel drive; the 2.5-liter turbocharged engine is available only in front wheel drive and is mated to an eight-speed wet dual-clutch transmission. Trim levels include LX, LXS, GT-Line, EX, and GT. US specification models will be assembled at Kia's West Point, Georgia assembly plant (KMMG).

Europe 
The Kia Optima was first introduced in 2010, but with a different shape and design compared to other markets. The European model had a choice to go either with diesel or gasoline engine options. It was manufactured in the company's facility in Zilina, Slovakia, and was positioned as a premium alternative to Kia's other models. Later the Optima was replaced by the new K5 version in 2015.

Powertrain

Safety 
The 2021-2022 K5 was awarded a Top Safety Pick+ from the IIHS.

Motorsport
The third generation Kia Optima was an official entry in the Pirelli World Challenge. In June 2012, Michael Galati drove the Infinity Audio-sponsored Optima to Kia's first victory in round 8 of the 2012 season at Canadian Tire Motorsport Park in Bowmanville, Ontario, Canada, while teammate Mark Wilkins finished in second place.

Kia Racing clinched the 2014 Pirelli World Challenge Grand Touring Sport (GTS) Class Manufacturer Championship in only its third season of competition.  Kia defeated rivals Ford, Chevrolet, Porsche, Aston Martin and Nissan to become the first Korean auto manufacturer to win the championship.  Kia Racing finished the season with 13 podium finishes, including 5 race wins. Meanwhile, the turbocharged Optima race cars led more on-track miles than any other manufacturer in the class this season.

The race car weighs  and is powered by an inline 4-cylinder engine generating 368 horsepower and uses a 6-speed sequential transmission.

Sales

References

External links

 

K5
Mid-size cars
Sedans
Convertibles
Station wagons
Police vehicles
Front-wheel-drive vehicles
2010s cars
Cars introduced in 2000
Hybrid electric cars
Euro NCAP large family cars
Plug-in hybrid vehicles
Vehicles with CVT transmission